The Beatrice Blues was the final and primary name of the minor league baseball teams located in Beatrice, Nebraska. Beatrice teams played as members of the Nebraska State League in 1892, from 1913 to 1915, 1922 to 1923, 1928, 1932 to 1938, the Missouri-Iowa-Nebraska-Kansas League in 1912 and the Tri-State League in 1924. They were affiliated with the Brooklyn Dodgers from 1936 to 1938.

About
The Beatrice Blues played at the High School Athletic Park. The field acquired lights in the early 1930s. The field still exists as the local high school football stadium.  Prior to the Blues, Beatrice was represented in the Nebraska State League in 1892. In partnership with neighboring Fairbury, Nebraska, the Beatrice-Fairbury Milkskimmers played as members in the Missouri-Iowa-Nebraska-Kansas League (MINK) in 1912. The Beatrice Milkskimmers played in the Nebraska State League from 1913 until the league disbanded in 1915.

1922–1923  Nebraska State League
In 1922 Beatrice, Nebraska was represented in the short-lived Nebraska State League by the Blues. The league had a split season. The Blue's were 25–28 in the first half and 31–32 in the second half and wound up in 4th place. Ralph Kirchner managed the team until July and Ducky Holmes replaced him for the remainder of the season. The 1923 team wound up in 5th place.

1924 Tri-State League
In 1924 the Lincoln Links returned to the Western League. The remaining Nebraska State League teams and some of the teams from the  collapsed South Dakota League formed the Tri-State League.  The Blues were in first place when the league disbanded on July 17.

1928, 1932–1938 Nebraska State League
In 1928 the Nebraska State League was restarted with eight teams. The 1928 Blue's were led by Jack Ellison. He was named to the All Star team and the Pinconning MI native had a 15–8 record.  Spud Owen averaged .343 and was also named to the All Star team.  In 1929 the Norton Jayhawks took over the franchise.

When the York Dukes dropped out of the Nebraska State League after the 1931 season Beatrice reentered the league and remained through the 1938 season. The 1932 Blues were led by Mike Pociask and Cotton Pippen. During the playoffs, Cotton pitched the third game of the series and won 5–3. He came back in the sixth game of the series and pitched a 2-hitter as Beatrice won 9–0. The next day he pitched the seventh game of the series.  There were 3,000 fans in the Beatrice stands. Cotton went 2 for 3 at the plate and won 4–3. He did not give up an earned run in four playoff appearances. 1933 was a near repeat of the previous year. Led by pitcher Mike Pociask they once again wound up in second place. Cotton won one of the playoff games and hit two home runs during the game.  Beatrice won the playoffs 5 games to 4. 1934 and 1935 were cellar years for the team. In 1936 the team secured a working agreement with the Brooklyn Dodgers. They were in 4th place in 1936, third in 1937 and again in third in 1938.

Year-by-year record

References
Nebraska Baseball History
Baseball Reference: Beatrice, Nebraska teams
 This article is based on the "Beatrice Blues" article at Baseball-Reference.com Bullpen. The Bullpen is a wiki, and its content is available under the GNU Free Documentation License.

Defunct minor league baseball teams
Brooklyn Dodgers minor league affiliates
Defunct baseball teams in Nebraska
1922 establishments in Nebraska
1938 disestablishments in Nebraska
Defunct Tri-State League teams
Nebraska State League teams
Missouri-Iowa-Nebraska-Kansas League (minor league) teams